Mark Suknanan (born May 28, 1991) is a Canadian singer, television personality and drag queen. Competing under his drag name, Priyanka, Suknanan won the first season of the reality competition series Canada's Drag Race in 2020. He was previously a host of the YTV children's series The Zone and the YTV reality competition series The Next Star, where he went by Mark Suki. His first EP, Taste Test, was released in 2021.

Early life
Suknanan was born on May 28, 1991, in Whitby, Ontario. He is of Indo-Guyanese descent. Suknanan is an alumnus of Niagara College's broadcasting program.

Career
Suknanan began his career as a host in children's television, most notably on YTV's The Zone and as the web host of the YTV reality competition series The Next Star.

Suknanan began performing as a drag queen in 2017, initially under the name Priyanka Love, in Toronto clubs. Her first competition in drag was for a local contest at the suggestion of fellow drag queen Xtacy Love, where she placed fourth. She quickly found success in the local drag scene, winning numerous titles, including Miss Crews and Tangos (2018–2019) and Woody's Queen of Halloween (2018). Priyanka was voted Toronto's best queen in Now's annual reader poll in 2019. Speaking about her rise to fame, Suknanan said: “I went from zero to 100... I came into drag so hard and built up a name so quickly that it just kind of became routine.” Priyanka has also performed as Mel B in a Spice Girls drag tribute act, alongside her Canada's Drag Race castmate Juice Boxx as Emma Bunton.

In 2020, Priyanka earned wider recognition as a contestant on the inaugural season of the reality competition series Canada's Drag Race, ultimately winning the competition over finalists Scarlett BoBo and Rita Baga. She became the first person of Indo-Caribbean descent to win in the franchise's global history. Throughout the season, her narrative included a running gag that the contrast between personas, as both established television personality Mark Suki by day and drag queen Priyanka by night, made her Canada's Hannah Montana; for Fierté Montréal's special online edition of its annual Drag Superstars show, which featured all of the Canada's Drag Race queens in prerecorded video performances, Priyanka performed to the Hannah Montana theme song "The Best of Both Worlds". She was also featured in Pride Toronto's online Drag Ball on June 27, 2020, performing to Marina and the Diamonds' single "Power & Control".

At the 9th Canadian Screen Awards in 2021, she received a nomination for Best Supporting Performance in a Web Program or Series for her Drag Ball appearance, and was one of the ten nominees for the fan-voted Audience Choice Award, as well as serving as the narrator of the livestream present⁹ation for lifestyle and reality categories on May 17.

Following the conclusion of the season, she headlined a cross-Canada tour with the other Canada's Drag Race contestants, which was performed at drive-in venues due to the ongoing social distancing restrictions remaining in place during the COVID-19 pandemic in Canada. In October, she participated alongside Scarlett Bobo, Rita Baga and Jimbo in an online panel discussion as part of the Just for Laughs festival. Priyanka was featured on the cover of Gay Times digital issue, her first magazine cover. In November and December 2020, Priyanka appeared as the celebrity spokesperson in a Canadian advertising campaign for SodaStream. She has also starred in online advertising campaigns for Shoppers Drug Mart and the Bank of Montreal.

In April 2021, she was announced as the host of the 2021 virtual edition of Pride Toronto. In May 2021, she partnered with Vizzy Hard Seltzer, serving as community impact director. In August 2021, they were a featured performer in Drag Fest, a live music festival. She currently co-hosts the Forever Dog podcast Famous This Week alongside Brooke Lynn Hytes, which won a Canadian Podcasting Award in 2022.

In July 2021, Priyanka released the EP Taste Test. which surpassed 10 million streams, as of February 2023. In addition, Priyanka was featured on the July/August 2021 edition of Elle Canada, becoming the first drag queen to do so.

In November 2021, Priyanka was named as a co-host with Lindsay Ell of the 2021 Canadian Country Music Awards. At the same time, she released the country music single "Country Queen". which she performed during the opening number of the award ceremony.

In February 2023, Suknanan signed a development deal with Bell Media on potential future television or film projects.

Personal life
Suknanan is openly gay. In November 2020, during the COVID-19 pandemic, Suknanan revealed that he had tested positive for and since recovered from COVID-19.

Filmography

Television

Music videos

Web series

Discography

Extended plays

Singles

As lead artist

As featured artist

Awards and nominations

References

External links

1991 births
Living people
21st-century Canadian LGBT people
Canada's Drag Race winners
Canadian children's television presenters
Canadian drag queens
Canadian gay men
Canadian LGBT broadcasters
Canadian LGBT singers
Canadian people of Indo-Guyanese descent
Canadian people of Indian descent
Canadian pop singers
Gay entertainers
Musicians from the Regional Municipality of Durham
People from Whitby, Ontario